The Copa Premier Honor Uruguayo or the Copa Honor Uruguayo was an international football friendly competition contested by Uruguay and Argentina national teams. It was played for on thirteen occasions between 1911 and 1924. All games were played in Montevideo.

Overview 
Outside the British Home Championship, Argentina–Uruguay is one of the oldest fixtures in international football. During the 1910s and 1920s they regularly played each other up to four times a year. In addition to South American Championship matches, the Copa Premier Honor Uruguayo was one of several trophies the two national teams regularly competed for during this era. The others included the Copa Premier Honor Argentino, which was played in Buenos Aires, the Copa Lipton and the Copa Newton.

For the final game in 1924, both teams were selected by dissident national associations. The Argentina team represented the "Asociación Amateurs de Football" while the Uruguay represented the "Federación Uruguaya de Football", both associations formed outside official bodies AFA and AUF.

List of champions

Finals
The following list includes all the editions of the Copa Premier Honor Uruguayo:

Titles by country

All-time scorers

Most finals by player
9:  Alfredo Foglino (won 6)
7:  Angel Romano (won 5),  Cayetano Saporiti (won 4)
6:   José Piendibene (won 5)
5:  Hector Scarone (won 4),  Pablo Dacal (won 4),  Juan Enrique Hayes (won 1)
4:  Juan Domingo Brown (won 1),  Carlos Tomás Wilson (won 1)
3:  Alberto Marcovecchio (won 3),  Carlos Scarone (won 2),  Pedro Calomino (won 1)

See also
 Copa Premier Honor Argentino
 Copa Lipton
 Copa Newton

References

p
p
p
p
p
1911 establishments
1924 disestablishments